Wonderful Days is a 2014 South Korean television series starring Lee Seo-jin, Kim Hee-sun and Ok Taecyeon. It aired on KBS2 from February 22 to August 10, 2014 on Saturdays and Sundays at 19:55 for 50 episodes. Written by Lee Kyung-hee, the drama tells the story of a prosecutor who returns to his hometown after 15 years and tries to reconnect with his long-estranged family and friends.

Synopsis
Kang Dong-seok overcame poverty and left his small town to become a successful prosecutor. A genius with an aloof kind of charisma, his arrogance and ill temper puts him at odds with many people, including his estranged family. After 15 years, Dong-seok is transferred back to his hometown and reconnects with his roots, re-learning the value of neighborly warmth in the countryside and the true meaning of love and family. His misfit siblings include Dong-hee, his younger brother who works for a money-lending business; his older brother Dong-tak, an events emcee who dreams of becoming an actor; and his twin sister Dong-ok, who is developmentally challenged and remained in a childlike state ever since an accident during their childhood.

Quick-tempered and swift-fisted, Dong-hee was kicked out of high school for getting into a brawl in an attempt to protect his classmate Seo Jeong-ah, who came to him three months later to tell him that she's pregnant. Nine years later, Dong-hee finds himself living with Seo's twins, who are being raised as his siblings, while scraping together a living as a bodyguard in the same company as Dong-seok's first love, Cha Hae-won. Despite her hardships in life, such as her father's bankruptcy, Hae-won is an upbeat woman, and eventually the feelings between her and Dong-seok are rekindled.

Cast

Main
Lee Seo-jin as Kang Dong-suk
Park Bo-gum as young Dong-suk
Kim Hee-sun as Cha Hae-won  
Kwon Mina as young Hae-won
Ok Taecyeon as Kang Dong-hee 
Dong-seok's younger brother

Supporting

Kang family
Ryu Seung-soo as Kang Dong-tak 
Dong-seok's older brother
Kim Ji-ho as Kang Dong-ok
Lee Hye-in as young Dong-ok
Dong-seok's twin sister
Kim Yeong-cheol as Kang Tae-sub, 
Dong-seok's, Dong-tak's, Dong-hee's, Dong-ok's father
Youn Yuh-jung as Jang So-shim
Dong-seok's, Dong-tak's, Dong-hee's, Dong-ok's  mother
Choi Hwa-jung as Ha Young-choon, 
Tae-seob's second wife and Dong-hee's biological mother
Oh Hyun-kyung as Kang Ki-soo 
Dong-seok's, Dong-tak's, Dong-hee's, Dong-ok's grandfather
Kim Sang-ho as Kang Ssang-shik 
Dong-suk's uncle
Kim Kwang-kyu as Kang Ssang-ho, 
Dong-seok's uncle
Kim Dan-yool as Kang Mool, 
Dong-tak's son
Hong Hwa-ri as Kang Dong-joo, 
Dong-hee's twin daughter
Choi Kwon-soo as Kang Dong-won, 
Dong-hee's twin son

Cha family

Jin Kyung as Cha Hae-joo 
Hae-won's older sister and becoming wife of Dong-tak's
Noh Kyung-joo as Lee Myung-soon 
Hae-won's mother

Extended

Park Joo-hyung as 
Dong-hee's love interest
Yoon Yoo-sun as Jo Young-ran
Go In-bum as Oh Chi-soo 
Seung-hoon's father
Choi Woong as Min Woo-jin
 Dong-ok's love interest
Yoon Ji-sook as Choi Mi-sook
Jang Joon-yoo as Han Jae-kyung
Oh Yong as Park Kyung-soo
Lee Yoo-joon as Bong Gook-soo
Kim Kwang-min as Jo Won
Lee Cho-hee as Seo Jung-ah
Dong-hee's ex and mother of twins
 Seo Hyun-chul as Han Bin / Hwang Gil-sang

Ratings 
In the tables below, the blue numbers represent the lowest ratings and the red numbers represent the highest ratings.

Awards and nominations

International broadcast

References

External links
  
 
 

2014 South Korean television series debuts
2014 South Korean television series endings
Korean Broadcasting System television dramas
Korean-language television shows
South Korean romance television series
Television shows written by Lee Kyung-hee
Television series by Samhwa Networks